Tazio is a masculine Italian given name. Notable people with the name include:

Tazio Nuvolari (1892–1953), Italian motorcycle and racecar driver
Tazio Roversi (1947–1999), Italian footballer
Tazio Secchiaroli (1925–1998), Italian photographer

See also 
Thaddeus (given name)

Italian masculine given names